William Lawrence Hicke (March 31, 1938 – July 18, 2005) was a Canadian professional ice hockey right winger. A native of Regina, Saskatchewan, Hicke played 14 seasons in the National Hockey League (NHL) for the Montreal Canadiens, New York Rangers, Oakland Seals/California Golden Seals and Pittsburgh Penguins, winning the Stanley Cup with Montreal in 1959 and 1960. Hicke's younger brother is Ernie Hicke.

Playing career
Hicke played junior hockey with the Regina Pats in the Saskatchewan Junior Hockey League (SJHL) from 1954 to 1958, Memorial Cup runners-up for three of those years. He joined the Montreal Canadiens from 1958 to 1965, including stints for Montreal's American Hockey League (AHL) affiliate the Rochester Americans during the 1958–59 and 1959-60 seasons, and the Cleveland Barons during 1964-65. Traded to the New York Rangers in 1964, he had stints with the Minnesota Rangers in 1965-66 and the Baltimore Clippers in 1966-67, but remained a Rangers product until being drafted by the Oakland Seals in the 1967 NHL Expansion Draft. Hicke played for the Seals until a 1971 trade to the Pittsburgh Penguins. In November 1971 Hicke was traded to the Detroit Red Wings but never played for the parent club, instead joining their affiliates the Tidewater Wings and Fort Worth Wings from 1971 to 1972. Hicke then played a single season for the World Hockey Association (WHA) Alberta Oilers in 1972-73 before retiring as a player.

Coaching career
From 1993 to 1994, Hicke coached and managed the Regina Pats. In 2005, he was awarded the WHL's Governor Award. Hicke died in his native Regina, Saskatchewan, at the age of 67, after a lengthy battle with cancer.

Awards and achievements
1959 Dudley "Red" Garrett Memorial Award winner (Rochester) (AHL)
1959 John B. Sollenberger Trophy winner (Rochester)
1959 Les Cunningham Award winner (Rochester)
1959 Stanley Cup  Championship  (Montreal) (NHL)
1960 Stanley Cup  Championship  (Montreal)
1959 NHL All-Star (Montreal)
1960 NHL All-Star (Montreal)
1969 NHL All-Star (Oakland)
1995 Saskatchewan Sports Hall of Fame inductee

Career statistics

See also
 List of family relations in the NHL

References

External links
 

1938 births
2005 deaths
Baltimore Clippers players
California Golden Seals players
Canadian expatriate ice hockey players in the United States
Canadian ice hockey coaches
Canadian ice hockey right wingers
Cleveland Barons (1937–1973) players
Deaths from cancer in Saskatchewan
Edmonton Oilers (WHA) players
Ice hockey people from Saskatchewan
Minnesota Rangers players
Montreal Canadiens players
New York Rangers players
Oakland Seals players
Pittsburgh Penguins players
Regina Pats coaches
Regina Pats players
Rochester Americans players
Sportspeople from Regina, Saskatchewan
Stanley Cup champions